Brahmāstra: Part One – Shiva is the soundtrack album for 2022 film of the same name starring Ranbir Kapoor, Alia Bhatt, Mouni Roy, Nagarjuna Akkineni and Amitabh Bachchan, written and directed by Ayan Mukerji. It is produced by Karan Johar, Apoorva Mehta, Namit Malhotra, and Mukerji – in his debut production – under the production companies Dharma Productions, Starlight Pictures, and Prime Focus in association with Star Studios, along with Kapoor and Marijke DeSouza. The film serves as the first installment of a planned trilogy, which is itself planned to be part of a cinematic universe titled Astraverse. The film's soundtrack score was composed and written by Pritam and produced and mixed by British musician Steel Banglez, with songs written by Amitabh Bhattacharya and Prasun Gupta, while English composer Simon Franglen assisted Pritam and the crew on some portions of the background score, which was primarily underlined by Jim Satya, Sunny M.R., Prasad Sashte and Ketan Sodha. The score was recorded at Synchron Stage Vienna.

Release 
On 10 April 2022, the first single of the film's soundtrack, titled "Kesariya" was unveiled. Three days later, a teaser of the song was released. "Kesariya" was released on 17 July 2022. On 4 August 2022, the second song from the soundtrack titled "Deva Deva" was unveiledand song was released on 8 August 2022. On 18 August 2022, First look poster of the third song, "Dance Ka Bhoot"and song was released on 25 August 2022. "Rasiya" was released on 24 September 2022. The Shiva Theme was released on 28 September 2022. 

The music album was released on 6 October 2022. Ayan Mukerji also revealed that the score will be released as a separate album with hopes for it to be released a few weeks after the film's theatrical release.

Track listing

Reception
On reviewing the first single "Kesariya", a critic from Pinkvilla called the song "pure auditory bliss with Arijit's velvet voice". On reviewing the second single "Deva Deva", another critic from Pinkvilla wrote that "The song begins with Shiva's journey as he unlocks his powers and channels his connection to the world of astras. The song also shows a glimpse of Amitabh Bachchan, who seems to be helping Ranbir connect with his light."
"Kesariya" peaked at #1 on Billboard India, and UK Asian charts. It also topped real-time charts on Apple Music and Spotify in India and Pakistan. 

The track surpassed 1 billion views across all platforms within four months of release.

References 

Hindi film soundtracks
2022 soundtrack albums